Casummit Lake is a settlement in the Unorganized Part of Kenora District, Ontario, Canada, about  northeast of the community of Red Lake. It is on the northeast shore of Casummit Lake.

References

Other map sources:

Communities in Kenora District